The Judo competition at the 1993 East Asian Games was contested in eight weight classes, eight each for men and women.

This competition was held at Jiading Gymnasium, from May 14 to 17, 1993.

Medal overview

Men's events

Women's events

Medals table

Sources
近代柔道 1993年7月号 [特集]第1回東アジア競技大会柔道競技 -近柔特派員Sの大会観戦レポート-. Baseball Magazine Sha Co., Ltd. 1993-07-20.

External links
Judo Union of Asia

1993
1993
Asian Games, East
1993 East Asian Games
Asian Games, East 1993